Ahsahka is a small unincorporated community located in Clearwater County, Idaho, United States, and is close to the Dworshak Dam. The ZIP Code for Ahsahka is 83520.

Climate

References

Unincorporated communities in Clearwater County, Idaho
Unincorporated communities in Idaho